Mattfeldia is a genus of flowering plants in groundsel tribe within the daisy family.

Species
There is only one known species, Mattfeldia triplinervis, known only from Haiti.

References

Senecioneae
Monotypic Asteraceae genera